The 2019 European Le Mans Series was the sixteenth season of the Automobile Club de l'Ouest's (ACO) European Le Mans Series. The six-event season began at Circuit Paul Ricard on 14 April and finished at Algarve International Circuit on 27 October.

The series is open to Le Mans Prototypes, divided into the LMP2 and LMP3 classes, and grand tourer-style racing cars in the LMGTE class.

Calendar
The provisional calendar for the 2019 season was announced on 21 September 2018. The calendar comprises six events, with the only change from the 2018 season being the addition of a race at Circuit de Barcelona-Catalunya, which replaces the Red Bull Ring as the third round of the season.

In April 2019, it was announced that the round in Barcelona would be held as an evening race, taking place on the Saturday evening of the event instead of the originally scheduled Sunday afternoon, primarily due to the anticipated hot weather in Spain in July.

The round at Silverstone is once again held in conjunction with the FIA World Endurance Championship.

Entries

LMP2
In accordance with the 2017 LMP2 regulations, all cars in the LMP2 class use the Gibson GK428 V8 engine.

LMP3
All cars in the LMP3 class use the Nissan VK50VE 5.0 L V8 engine and Michelin tyres.

LMGTE
All cars in the LMGTE class use Dunlop Tyres.

Results
Bold indicates overall winner.

To be classified a car will have to cross  the  finish  line  on  the  race  track  when the  chequered  flag  is  shown,  except  in  a  case  of force majeure at the Stewards’ discretion and have  covered  at  least  70% (the  official  number  of  laps  will  be  rounded down to the nearest whole number) of the  distance  covered  by  the  car  classified  in  first  place  in  the overall classification.

Teams Championships
Points are awarded according to the following structure:

LMP2 Teams Championship

LMP3 Teams Championship

LMGTE Teams Championship

Drivers Championships
Points are awarded according to the following structure:

LMP2 Drivers Championship

LMP3 Drivers Championship

LMGTE Drivers Championship

Notes

References

External links
 

European Le Mans Series seasons
European Le Mans Series
Le Mans Series